Under the Southern Cross (Italian: Sotto la croce del sud) is a 1938 Italian drama film directed by Guido Brignone and starring Antonio Centa, Doris Duranti and Enrico Glori. The film is set in Italian-occupied Abyssinia following the recent Italian victory there. It was one of a sequence of eight films set in Italy's African Empire during the Fascist era that were released between 1936 and 1939. The film is a propaganda piece designed to support Fascist policy on empire and concerns about inter-racial romances.

It was shot at the Tirrenia Studios in Tuscany and on location in the Galla Territory of Italian Ethiopia.

Synopsis
Marco the owner of a coffee plantation in Abyssinia, is trying to play his part in building the new Italian Empire. He becomes concerned however that his Italian staff, in the absence of their wives and families, are becoming overly attracted to native woman. His junior partner Paolo has to resist the allures of Mailù, an attractive young Middle Eastern woman.

Main cast
 Antonio Centa as Paolo 
 Doris Duranti as Mailù 
 Enrico Glori as Simone 
 Giovanni Grasso as Marco, il capo della piantagione 
 Salvatore Cuffaro as Pisani 
 Carlo Duse as Donati 
 Fausto Guerzoni as Coppola 
 Enrico Marroni as Todini 
 Felice Minotti as Riva 
 Piero Pastore as Casale

References

Bibliography 
 Forgacs, David. Italy's Margins: Social Exclusion and Nation Formation since 1861. Cambridge University Press, 2014. 
 Palumbo, Patrizia. A Place in the Sun: Africa in Italian Colonial Culture from Post-unification to the Present. University of California Press, 2003.
 Reich, Jacqueline & Garofalo, Piero. Re-viewing Fascism: Italian Cinema, 1922-1943. Indiana University Press, 2002.

External links 

1938 films
Italian drama films
Italian black-and-white films
1938 drama films
1930s Italian-language films
Films directed by Guido Brignone
Films set in Ethiopia
Films shot in Ethiopia
Films shot at Tirrenia Studios
Films scored by Renzo Rossellini
1930s Italian films